This is a list of Latvian ice hockey players who have played in the National Hockey League (NHL).

Apart from the players listed below, there have been several NHL players of Latvian descent. Harold Snepsts, Mike Knuble as well as Aris Brimanis and Jarrod Skalde are among such examples.

Players 
This is a list of players drafted in the NHL Amateur and Entry Draft. In 1975 Viktor Khatulev became the first Latvian and also the first Soviet hockey player to be drafted. 

 Red players did not play in the NHL.

There were 3 undrafted Latvian NHL players - Herberts Vasiļjevs, Pēteris Skudra and Matīss Kivlenieks.

Statistics
Sandis Ozoliņš is the record-holder in all categories, while Kārlis Skrastiņš owned the NHL record for
most consecutive games by a defenceman.

Regular season

Scoring

Goaltenders

Play-offs

Scoring

Goaltenders

See also 
List of Latvians in the Kontinental Hockey League

Latvian players
ice hockey